Jackie Kellogg (born March 29, 1971) is a former American and Canadian football defensive back in the Canadian Football League (CFL), World League of American Football (WLAF), Arena Football League (AFL) and XFL. He played college football at Eastern Washington.

References

1971 births
Living people
Players of American football from Tacoma, Washington
American players of Canadian football
American football defensive backs
Canadian football defensive backs
Eastern Washington Eagles football players
Calgary Stampeders players
Frankfurt Galaxy players
Tampa Bay Storm players
Edmonton Elks players
Memphis Maniax players